Van Raalte is a Dutch surname.

People with the surname include:
 Albert van Raalte (1890-1952), a Dutch conductor
 Albertus van Raalte (1811-1876), a Dutch Reformed clergyman and founder of Holland, Michigan
 Dirk Van Raalte (1844-1910), an American soldier and politician
 H. (Henri Benedictus) van Raalte (1881-1929), an English-born Australian artist and printmaker
 Herman van Raalte (1921-2013), a Dutch football player
 Jan van Raalte (born 1968), a Dutch football player and manager
 Noel Van Raalte (1888-1940), a British racing car driver

Other uses:
 Benjamin Van Raalte House, a historic building in Holland, Michigan

See also
 Raalte, a town in the Dutch province of Overijssel. 

Dutch-language surnames